Deh Piaz (also Romanized as Deh Pīāz, Deh Peyāz, and Deh Pīyāz) is a village in Hegmataneh Rural District, in the Central District of Hamadan County, Hamadan Province, Iran. At the 2006 census, its population was 4,078, in 902 families.

References 

Populated places in Hamadan County